Hisonotus vespuccii is a species of catfish in the family Loricariidae. It is a freshwater species native to South America where it occurs in the São Francisco River and three of its tributaries: the Das Velhas River, the Paraopeba River, and the Formoso River. It is found in areas with marginal vegetation and reaches  SL. The species was named after the Italian explorer Amerigo Vespucci.

References 

Otothyrinae
Fish of the São Francisco River basin
Fish described in 2015